Naderiore is a monotypic genus of hubbardiid short-tailed whipscorpions, first described by Pinto-da-Rocha, Andrade & Moreno-González in 2016. Its single species, Naderiore carajas is distributed in Brazil.

References 

Schizomida genera
Monotypic arachnid genera